William Borgen (born December 19, 1996) is an American professional ice hockey defenseman currently playing for the Seattle Kraken of the National Hockey League (NHL).

Playing career

Early career
Borgen attended Moorhead High School in Minnesota, leading the school in his final year as captain before joining the Omaha Lancers in the United States Hockey League to complete the 2014–15 season.

Borgen was drafted by the Buffalo Sabres in the 2015 NHL Entry Draft, in the fourth round, 92nd overall. He began his collegiate career the following season with St. Cloud State University of the National Collegiate Hockey Conference while majoring in sports management.

Collegiate

In his freshman season at St. Cloud State, Borgen recorded his first collegiate point, an assist, in a game against Michigan University on October 30. He later recorded his first collegiate goal during the NCHC playoffs against Western Michigan. In the end, he recorded 11 assists in conference games to lead all NCHC freshman defenseman. As a result, he was selected for the NCHC All-Rookie team.

In his junior year, Borgen recorded a career high, and team leading, 14 points to earn NCHC Defensive Defenseman of the Year. He was also named an All-NCHC Honorable Mention.

Professional
At the completion of his junior season with the Huskies in 2017–18, in which he was selected as the Conference's defensive defenseman of the year, Borgen was signed to an entry-level professional contract by the Sabres on March 25, 2018. He was assigned to join the Sabres' AHL affiliate, the Rochester Americans on an amateur try-out agreement to play out the remainder of the campaign. He eventually made his NHL debut against the Ottawa Senators on March 26, 2019.

On July 21, 2021, Borgen was selected from the Sabres by the Seattle Kraken in the 2021 NHL Expansion Draft.

International play
Borgen was first selected to represent the United States at the 2016 World Junior Championships. He contributed with 3 assists in 7 games, as Team USA captured the bronze medal.

On January 1, 2018, Borgen was selected to compete at the 2018 Winter Olympics.

Career statistics

Regular season and playoffs

International

Awards and honors

References

External links
 

1996 births
Living people
American men's ice hockey defensemen
Buffalo Sabres draft picks
Buffalo Sabres players
Ice hockey players from Minnesota
People from Moorhead, Minnesota
Omaha Lancers players
Olympic ice hockey players of the United States
Ice hockey players at the 2018 Winter Olympics
Rochester Americans players
Seattle Kraken players
St. Cloud State Huskies men's ice hockey players